Trust No One is the first and to date only compilation album of the Californian punk band Tsunami Bomb. The album was released on February 26, 2016 via Kung Fu Records on CD and LP and is the first release of the band since their studio album The Definitive Act (2004, Kung Fu). The album contains songs from the band that were recorded and/or released in 1999 and 2000 on compilation albums, split albums or early EPs. Two songs were previously unreleased demos.

Tsunami Bomb dissolved in 2005 and reunited 10 years later in 2015. The album features the original line-up: bassist/vocalist Dominic Davi, keyboardist Oobliette Sparks, drummer Gabriel Lindeman, and guitarist Brian Plink. Emily "Agent M" Whitehurst decided not to join and to focus on her main solo project, Survival Guide.

Track listing 
Track 1 originally appeared on the Springman Records compilation album Punk Rock Strike (2000). Track 2 originally appeared on the B-Movie Queens (1999) split with Plinky. Tracks 4-7 originally appeared on the Mayhem On the high Seas (1999) EP. Tracks 12-14 originally appeared on the EP The Invasion from Within! (2001). Tracks 3 and 8 were previously unreleased demos.
 "Lemonade (1999)" - 2:31
 "Irish Boys" - 2:48
 "Obligation" - 2:50
 "3 Days & 1000 Nights" - 2:25
 "Rotting Vampire Eyeballs" - 1:04
 "Cantare Del Morte (The Halloween Song)" - 3:28
 "Breakaway" - 2:58
 "Mushy Love Song" - 4:18
 "The Invasion From Within" - 2:25
 "No One's Looking" - 2:42
 "No Good Very Bad Day" - 1:46
 "Marionette" - 3:05
 "Lemonade" - 2:24
 "...Not Forever" - 3:00

Performers 
 Agent M - vocals
 Dominic Davi - bass, vocals
 Oobliette Sparks - keyboards, vocals
 Gabriel Lindeman - drums
 Brian Plink - guitar

References 

Tsunami Bomb albums
2016 compilation albums